Belews Creek (sometimes, "Belew Creek") is an unincorporated community in the Belews Creek Township of Forsyth County, North Carolina, United States.

History
Belews Creek was originally named "Belews Creek Mill" and a post office has been located in the community since 1831 .

Demographics
Belews Creek's Zip Code Tabulation Area (Zip Code 27009) has a population of about 2,647 as of the 2010 census.  The population is 50.6% male and 49.4% female.  About 91% of the population is white, 7.4% African-American, 1.1% Hispanic, and 0.3% of other races.  0.7% of people are two or more races.

The median household income is $50,345 with 2.6% of the population living below the poverty line.

Notable person
 Jester Hairston, actor

See also
 Belews Creek Township

References

^ "US Gazetteer files: 2010, 2000, and 1990". United States Census Bureau. 2011-02-12. Retrieved 2011-04-23.

Unincorporated communities in Forsyth County, North Carolina
Unincorporated communities in North Carolina
Populated places established in 1831